Ariel A. Roth (born 1927) is a zoologist and creationist who was born in Geneva, Switzerland, and now lives in the United States. He is a leading figure in the field of flood geology, having been involved and published extensively on the creation–evolution controversy.

Roth is a former professor and chairman of Biology at Emmanuel Missionary College, now Andrews University and at Loma Linda University. He is also the former director of the Seventh-day Adventist run Geoscience Research Institute at Loma Linda University. He served as editor of the journal Origins for 23 years.

After receiving his PhD in Biology at the University of Michigan, Roth pursued research in invertebrate zoology and on fossil and living coral reefs funded by NOAA, the National Institutes of Health, and other government agencies.  He obtained additional training to facilitate his research in radiation biology, geology and mathematics at various campuses of the University of California.  He has been a longtime member of the Geological Society of America and the Society for Sedimentary Geology. Roth has published many articles in both scientific and popular journals and lectured worldwide.

Early life
Ariel Roth's parents were Andre and Hazel Roth, Seventh-day Adventist missionaries who served in Haiti, France and Switzerland. His oldest brother, Lionel Andre Roth, also attended PUC and graduated with a medical degree from Loma Linda in 1946. He had a sister, Elvire Hilgert.

Education
Roth received his Bachelor of Arts in biology from Pacific Union College in 1948, and his Master of Science in biology (1949) and Ph.D. in parasitology (1955) from the University of Michigan. He received additional training in geology, radiobiology, and mathematics at University of California, Berkeley and University of California, Riverside.

Career

In the fall of 1950, Roth joined the biology department at Pacific Union College (PUC). He worked at PUC until 1957. In 1958, Roth took the place of Frank L. Marsh as chairman of the biology department at Emmanuel Missionary College (EMC), now known as Andrews University.

In 1961, while Roth was head of the biology department at EMC, the United States Public Health Service awarded the department $17,082 to be used in a three-year study of the disease schistosomiasis. During the 1950s and 1960s Roth published several studies related to this disease and its related snail vector.

In May 1974, Roth and two other scientists from Loma Linda University lived for a week fifty feet under the ocean's surface near Freeport, Grand Bahama Island. His team studied coral formations. The three lived in an anchored 18-foot metal hydro-lab when
not conducting their experiments. The underwater laboratory and sleeping quarters was operated by the United States National Oceanic and Atmospheric Administration and was used by several groups.

Academic activities and honors
 United States Atomic Energy Commission Grantee in radiation biology (1960)
 National Institutes of Health Grantee for research on metabolism of schistosomes (1961-1963)
 Visiting Research Scientist, Hawaii Institute of Marine Biology (1968, 1970)
 Visiting Professor, Andrews University Extension in Europe (1970)
 United States Atomic Energy Commission Grantee for research on coral reefs at Enewetak Atoll (1971, 1972, 1973)
 Member, NSF-AEC sponsored Symbios research team to study coral reef metabolism at Enewetak Atoll (1971)
 Consultant on creation to the California State Board of Education (1971)
 Director, Loma Linda University Research Team for underwater research on coral in the Bahamas (1973, 1974 - Sponsored by the National Oceanic and Atmospheric Administration; lived on the ocean floor for 1 week)
 Listed in Who's Who in America (1974)
 Editor: ORIGINS journal (1974-1996)
 Keynote speaker, public hearing, House Education Committee, Oregon Legislative Assembly (1981)
 Witness for the State of Arkansas: Evolution-creation trial (1981)
 Visiting Professor of Biology, University of Eastern Africa, Baraton (1995)
 Visiting Professor of Biology, Spicer College, India (1995)
 Adjunct Professor of Science and Religion, SDA Theological Seminary, Andrews University (1993–1996)
 Recipient Medallion of Distinction, the highest award of the Department of Education of the Seventh-day Adventist Church (1997)
 Visiting Professor of Biology, Caribbean Union College (1997)
 Lecturer for the William A. Osborne Distinguished Lecture Series, Caribbean Union College (1997)
 Honored alumnus Pacific Union College
 Member, Loma Linda University Councilors (2000- )
 Recipient: Charles Elliott Weniger Award for Excellence 2003

Advocacy of creationism
In late 1972 or early 1973 he presented to the California Board of Education hearings on Creation and the classroom.

In 1980, Roth argued that "Creation and various other views can be supported by the scientific data that reveal that the spontaneous origin of the complex integrated biochemical systems of even the simplest organisms is, at best, a most improbable event", which is regarded as a precursor to Michael Behe's irreducible complexity argument, which has been the subject of considerable empirical refutation from the scientific community. Roth later used a version of this argument in his testimony in McLean v. Arkansas (which struck down the Arkansas Balanced Treatment for Creation-Science and Evolution-Science Act), where he testified in support of the scientific merits of creationism, but admitted that "[i]f you want to define 'science' as testable, predictable" then creation science is not really science. In the same year, he testified before the Oregon House Education Committee in support of a similar "balanced treatment" law. His view is that science should emancipate itself from its limited secularism and "should allow the data of nature to direct . . . wherever it may lead."

Selected publications 
Has published nearly 200 articles in the scientific and public press.

1950s

 
 

1960s

 Roth, A.A. 1960. Aspects of the function of the bursa copulatrix and seminal receptacle in the prosobranch snail Oncomelania formosana Pilsbry and Hirase. Transactions of the American Microscopical Society 79: 412-419.
 Roth, A.A. and E.D. Wagner. 1960a. The development of sexual maturity in Oncomelania nosophora (Robson) snail vector of oriental schistosomiasis. Transactions of the American Microscopical Society 79:429-438.
 Roth, A.A. and E.D. Wagner. 1960b. Notes on the production of eggs in Oncomelania nosophora and O. formosana. Nautilus 73:147-151.
 Roth, A.A. and L.N. Hare. 1966. Effect of Schistosoma mansoni on amino acid levels in a chemically defined medium. (Abstract) American Society of Parasitologists, 41st Annual Meeting, San Juan, Puerto Rico, p. 60.
 Roth, A.A. and H.E. Heidtke. 1966. Removal of schisto-somes from hosts with minimal physiological disturbance to the parasite. Transactions of the American Microscopical Society 85:422-426.
 Tkachuck, R.D. and A.A. Roth. 1967. Free amino acids in plasm of mice infected with Schistosoma mansoni. (Abstract) American Society of Parasitologists, 42nd Annual Meeting, Tucson, Arizona, p. 29.
 Carter, C.E. and A.A. Roth. 1967. Carbon dioxide fixation in Schistosoma mansoni. (Abstract) American Society of Parasitologists, 42nd Annual Meeting, Tucson, Arizona, p. 30.

1970s

 Roth, A.A. 1971a. Effect of various light treatments of calcification rates in Acropora sp. (Abstract) R/V Alpha Helix Research Program, 1971, Scripps Institution of Oceanography, San Diego, p. 21.
 Roth, A.A. 1971b. Effect of the addition of nutrients on the variability of calcification rates in a single colony of Pocillopora damicornis. (Abstract) R/V Alpha Helix Research Program, 1971, Scripps Institution of Oceano-graphy, San Diego, pp. 21–22.
 Roth, A.A. 1971c. Estimate of carbonate production of some species on Japtan Reef. (Abstract) R/V Alpha Helix Research Program, 1971, Scripps Institution of Oceanography, San Diego, p. 22.
 Johannes, R.E. and 22 other authors including A.A. Roth. 1972. Project Symbios: an examination of the metabolism of some coral reef communities. BioScience 22:541-543.
 Roth, A.A. 1974c. Factors affecting light as an agent for carbonate production by coral. (Abstract) Geological Society of America Abstracts 6:932.

 Roth, A.A. 1975e. Some effects of light on calcification in coral. Abstracts of Symposia and Contributed Papers for the Fifty-Sixth Annual Meeting (San Francisco State University, December 26–30, 1975) of the Western Society of Naturalists, p. 29.
 Clausen, C.D. and A.A. Roth. 1975a. Estimation of coral growth rates from laboratory 45Ca-incorporation rates. Marine Biology 33:85-91.
 
 Smith, A.D. and A.A. Roth. 1977. Carbon dioxide and calcification in the red coralline alga, Bossiella orbigniana. (Abstract) Pacific Division, American Associa-tion for the Advancement of Science, 58th Annual Meeting, San Francisco State University.
 ; Rebuttal, 28-29.
 

1980s

 Roth, A.A. 1980a. Implications of various interpretations of the fossil record. Origins 7:71-86.
 Crabtree, D.M., C.D. Clausen, and A.A. Roth. 1980. Consistency in growth line counts in bivalve specimens. Palaeogeography, Palaeoclimatology, Palaeoecology 29:323-340.
 Roth, A.A., C.D. Clausen, P.Y. Yahiku, V.E. Clausen, and W.W. Cox. 1982. Some effects of light on coral growth. Pacific Science 36:65-81.
 Roth, A.A. 1983b. Why some scientists believe in creation. These Times 92(3):6-11.
 Roth, A.A. 1984a. The current controversy over origins. Part I: teaching creation in public schools. The Journal of Adventist Education 46(3):30-31,35-37.
 Roth, A.A. 1984b. The current controversy over origins. Part II: Seventh-day Adventists and the creation movement in the United States. The Journal of Adventist Education 46(4):31-32,39-40.
Hodges, L.T. and Roth, A.A. 1986. Orientation of corals and stromatoporoids in some Pleistocene, Devonian, and Silurian reef facies. Journal of Paleontology 60:1147-1158.

1990s

Roth, A.A. 1998. The disadvantage of collective ignorance. The Record (Australia), August 29, 1998, p. 3.
(Book now in 17 languages.)
Roth, A.A. 1999. Chapter Essay. In Ashton, J.F. In Six Days. New Holland Publishers. p. 74-89.

2000s

Roth, A.A. 2000. The Grand Canyon and the Genesis Flood. In Baldwin J.T. Creation, Catastrophe, and Calvary. Review and Herald Publishing Association. p. 97-103.
Roth, A.A. 2001. Commonly Asked questions about science and the Bible. The Journal of Adventist Education. 64(2): 9-18.
Roth, A.A. 2003. Genesis and the geologic column. Dialogue 15(1): 9-12, 18.
Roth, A.A. 2003. Implications of parconformities. Geoscience Reports No. 36: 1-5.
Roth, A.A. 2005. Design in nature: Evidence for a Creator. In Wesracott, M.J. and Ashton J.F. editors. The Big Argument. Sydney: Strand Publishing. p. 99-122.
Roth, A.A., Zoutewelle T., Hornbacher D. 2006. Complex concretions in the Jurassic Morrison Formation. Geological Society of America, Abstracts with Programs 39(6): 7.
Roth, A.A. 2008. Science Discovers God: Seven convincing lines of evidence for His existence. Hagerstown, MD: Review and Herald Publishing Association. (Book now in 28 languages.)
Roth, A.A. 2009. Flat gaps in sedimentary rock layers challenge long geologic ages. Journal of Creation 23(2): 76-81.

2010s

Roth, A.A. 2011. Can I believe in a worldwide flood? In Gibson L.J., Rasi H.M., editors. Understanding Creation. Nampa, ID: Pacific Press Publishing Association. p. 123-132.
Roth, A.A. 2012. The Genesis Flood and the geological record. In Ball, B.W., editor: In the Beginning: Science and Scripture Confirm Creation. Nampa, ID: Pacific Press Publishing Association. p. 220-237.
Roth, A.A. 2013. The Bible and science: A new free illustrated resource for teachers and students. Journal of Adventist Education, February/March, p. 44-46.
Roth, A.A., Nick, K.E., Zoutewellw T., and Hornbacher D. 2019. Complex siliceous concretions in the Jurassic Morrison Formation, Church Rock, New Mexico, USA: Implications of inorganic factors in ichnological interpretations. Sedimentary Geology, Vol. 392, Article  105526, October, 1. https://doi.org/10.1016/j.sedgeo.2019.105526

2020s

Roth, A.A. 2021. Flat Gaps in the Rock Layers Challenge Long Geologic Layers In Gibson, L.J., Nalin R., and Rasi H.M., editors. Design and Catastrophe: 51 Scientists Explore Evidence in Nature. Andrews University Press. Chapter 47.

See also
Leonard R. Brand
Creation and evolution in public education
Flood geology
Geoscience Research Institute
McLean v. Arkansas
Young earth creationism

Notes

References

Roth, Ariel A. Curriculum Vitae. 

  Includes audio recording of Roth's presentation. General Conference of Seventh-day Adventists, 59th Session, Atlanta, Georgia, US. Recorded 6/27/10, 5:45 PM

External links
 science and scriptures
The Bible Science Association

 
 

Pacific Union College alumni
1927 births
Living people
American Seventh-day Adventists
American Christian creationists
University of Michigan alumni
Scientists from Geneva
Swiss emigrants to the United States